The 82nd Avenue of Roses Parade is an annual event in Portland, Oregon, United States, established in 2007. The parade is organized by the 82nd Avenue of Roses Business Association, part of a local business group called Venture Portland, as an effort to improve 82nd Avenue's image.

History
The parade kicked off the Portland Rose Festival starting in 2007.

In 2017, the parade was cancelled when the 82nd Avenue of Roses Business Association announced that there were "threats of violence during the parade by multiple groups planning to demonstrate at the event." A Multnomah County Republican Party group planned to participate in the parade, announcing their participation with a Facebook event "chastising left-leaning protests." This was followed by allegations that local "antifa" groups would disrupt the Republican group's participation in the parade and that other right-wing groups would try to stop the leftist disruption.

The 2019 parade was on 27 April, and started at the Eastport Plaza. It's Portland's largest east side parade, consisting of 55-60 entries including floats, bands, classic automobiles, and various marching groups. The COVID-19 pandemic caused the parade to go on hiatus since 2020.

References

2007 establishments in Oregon
Annual events in Portland, Oregon
Recurring events established in 2007
Parades in the United States